Jan Boháček (born February 25, 1969) is a Czech former professional ice hockey defenceman. He is currently head coach of HC Řisuty of the 2nd Czech Republic Hockey League.

Boháček played in the Czechoslovak First Ice Hockey League and the Czech Extraliga for HC Sparta Praha, HC Pardubice, HC Dukla Jihlava, HC Olomouc, HC České Budějovice, HC Kladno and HC Havířov. He also played in France for Drakkars de Caen and Dauphins d'Épinal, in Italy for HC Pustertal Wölfe and in Poland for TH Unia Oświęcim.

Boháček became head coach of HC Řisuty on June 15, 2020.

References

External links

1969 births
Living people
Motor České Budějovice players
Czech ice hockey coaches
Czech ice hockey defencemen
Dauphins d'Épinal players
Drakkars de Caen players
HC Dukla Jihlava players
HC Dynamo Pardubice players
HC Havířov players
HC Karlovy Vary players
Rytíři Kladno players
HC Kobra Praha players
BK Mladá Boleslav players
HC Olomouc players
People from Tábor
HC Pustertal Wölfe players
HC Sparta Praha players
HC Tábor players
TH Unia Oświęcim players
Sportspeople from the South Bohemian Region
Czech expatriate ice hockey players in Russia
Czech expatriate sportspeople in Italy
Czech expatriate sportspeople in France
Czech expatriate sportspeople in Poland
Expatriate ice hockey players in Italy
Expatriate ice hockey players in Poland
Expatriate ice hockey players in France